A municipal election took place in Madrid on Sunday, 2 May 1909, seeking to renew the 22 vacant posts of the City Council.

Results 
There was no election in the district of Universidad as there was the same number of candidates than vacant councillors; and thus the candidates were proclaimed in accordance with the article 29 of the electoral law. The definitive results (grouped by partisan affiliation) resulted into 12 Republicans, 5 conservatives, 3 from the Social Defence, 1 liberal and 1 democrat.

The general turnout grew up until roughly a 70% of the electorate (manhood suffrage) thanks to the compulsory voting established in the Electoral Law, but it refuted the wrong perception Maura upheld about the until then disenfranchised masses supposedly being conservative, thus guaranteeing Conservative majorities.

The results of the election along those from the next election celebrated in December 1909 would turn the municipal group jointly integrated by Republicans and Socialists the largest in the council (with 23 members).

References 
Citations

Bibliography
 
 

1909 in Spain
1900s in Madrid
Elections in Madrid
1909 elections in Europe